

458001–458100 

|-id=063
| 458063 Gustavomuler ||  || Gustavo Muler (born 1967), an Argentine-born Spanish amateur astronomer and discoverer of minor planets || 
|}

458101–458200 

|-bgcolor=#f2f2f2
| colspan=4 align=center | 
|}

458201–458300 

|-bgcolor=#f2f2f2
| colspan=4 align=center | 
|}

458301–458400 

|-bgcolor=#f2f2f2
| colspan=4 align=center | 
|}

458401–458500 

|-bgcolor=#f2f2f2
| colspan=4 align=center | 
|}

458501–458600 

|-bgcolor=#f2f2f2
| colspan=4 align=center | 
|}

458601–458700 

|-bgcolor=#f2f2f2
| colspan=4 align=center | 
|}

458701–458800 

|-bgcolor=#f2f2f2
| colspan=4 align=center | 
|}

458801–458900 

|-bgcolor=#f2f2f2
| colspan=4 align=center | 
|}

458901–459000 

|-bgcolor=#f2f2f2
| colspan=4 align=center | 
|}

References 

458001-459000